Pustá Polom is a municipality and village in Opava District in the Moravian-Silesian Region of the Czech Republic. It has about 1,400 inhabitants.

Geography
It lies in the Nízký Jeseník mountain range.

History
The first written mention of Pustá Polom is from 1238.

Notable people
Jan Novotný (1929–2005), glass artist and painter

References

External links

Villages in Opava District